Soul Buster (侍灵演武 Shìlíngyǎnwǔ) (ソウルバスター Sourubasutā) is a Chinese manhua written and illustrated by Bai Mao and based on the 14th century novel Romance of the Three Kingdoms by Luo Guanzhong. A Japanese-Chinese animated series adaptation by Studio Pierrot and co-produced with Youku Tudou which aired from October 4 to December 11, 2016.

Characters
Son Shin

Zhou Yu

Ryō Un

Barin Yi

Shuijing

Zhang

Emperor Xian of Han

Wei Yan

Zhou Cang

Cao Xing

Feng Ya

Bo Anzi

Cheng Pu

School nurse

References

External links
Official anime website 

Works based on Romance of the Three Kingdoms
Pierrot (company)
Animated series based on comics
Animated series based on novels
Manhua titles
Comics adapted into animated series
Tokyo MX original programming
Comics set in China